Windows Code page 936 (abbreviated MS936, Windows-936 or (ambiguously) CP936), is Microsoft's character encoding for simplified Chinese, one of the four DBCSs for East Asian languages. Originally, Windows-936 covered GB 2312 (in its EUC-CN form), but it was expanded to cover most of GBK with the release of Windows 95.

IBM's Code page 936 is a different encoding for Simplified Chinese, although International Components for Unicode does not include an IBM-936 codec, and uses the Windows code page for the "cp936" label. IBM's code page for GBK coverage is Code page 1386 (CP1386 or IBM-1386), which is defined as a combination of the single byte Code page 1114 and the double byte Code page 1385.

It was superseded by code page 54936 (GB 18030), but  was still prevalent in use. The Windows command prompt uses CP936 as the default code page for simplified Chinese installations, although part of the GB 18030 was made mandatory for all software products sold in China. In 2002, the IANA Internet name GBK was registered with Windows-936's mapping, making it the de facto GBK definition on the Internet.

The concepts of "Windows-936", "GBK", "GB2312" and "EUC-CN" are sometimes confused in various software products. Code pages MS936 and 1386 are not identical to GBK because a code page encodes characters, whereas GBK only defines code points. In addition, the Euro sign (€), encoded as 0x80 in both Windows-936 and IBM-1386, is not defined in GBK. On the other hand, 95 characters defined in GBK were initially not encoded into Windows-936.

This is partly resolved in later versions of Windows and, as in Windows 7, all GBK characters not in the Unicode BMP Private Use Area can be displayed using code page 936, but encoding the 95 characters was still not supported . However, "CP936" and "GBK" are often used interchangeably because of the popularity of Microsoft products on the Chinese market when GBK was then published.

Since GBK superseded GB 2312 long ago, these two terms have also become virtually equivalent to many users, so "Windows-936", "GBK" and "GB 2312" are misunderstood by many to mean the same thing while they actually differ significantly. Instead of supporting precisely EUC-CN / GB 2312, most modern-day Windows-based software products mean partial support for GBK via Windows-936 when they use the term "GB 2312" as a character encoding option. This can be observed in products such as Microsoft Internet Explorer and Notepad++.

Notes

References

External links
Windows-936:
Microsoft's reference for Windows-936
Code page file for Windows-936
Mapping of Windows-936 to Unicode
ICU demonstration of Windows-936
International Components for Unicode (ICU), windows-936-2000.ucm
IBM-1386:
IBM's documentation for IBM-1386
ICU demonstration of IBM-1386
ICU mapping of IBM-1386 to Unicode

1386
Encodings of Asian languages